In mathematics, the Christoffel–Darboux theorem is an identity for a sequence of orthogonal polynomials, introduced by  and . It states that

 

where fj(x) is the jth term of a set of orthogonal polynomials of squared norm hj and leading coefficient kj.

There is also a "confluent form" of this identity:

Version for Associated Legendre Polynomials

In the case of associated Legendre polynomials, the relation takes the form:

See also
Turán's inequalities
Sturm Chain

References

 (Hardback,  Paperback)

Orthogonal polynomials
Functional analysis